Matúš Kmeť (born 27 June 2000) is a Slovak professional footballer who plays for AS Trenčín as a midfielder.

Club career

MFK Ružomberok
Kmeť made his Fortuna Liga debut for Ružomberok against Žilina on 4 August 2018.

AS Trenčín
In December 2020, it was announced that Kmeť had been transferred to AS Trenčín, signing a three-year contract. He made his debut on 20 February 2021 against FK Senica.

References

External links
 MFK Ružomberok official profile 
 Futbalnet profile 
 
 

2000 births
Living people
Slovak footballers
Slovakia youth international footballers
Slovakia under-21 international footballers
Association football midfielders
MFK Ružomberok players
AS Trenčín players
Slovak Super Liga players
2. Liga (Slovakia) players
Sportspeople from Ružomberok